The 2021 Philadelphia Union season was the club's twelfth season in Major League Soccer, the top flight of American soccer. The team is managed by Jim Curtin, his eighth season with the club. The club's regular season began on April 7, 2021 with the CONCACAF Champions League, and then on April 17, 2021 with MLS play, and ended on November 7, 2021, a month-delayed start due to the COVID-19 pandemic. Outside of MLS, the Union, by winning the 2020 Supporters' Shield, is competing in their first ever CONCACAF Champions League.

Background
The 2021 preseason saw turnover in the coaching positions as assistant coach Oka Nikolov departed and replaced by Frank Leicht.

The transfer window was the Union's most lucrative to date selling two MLS Best XI players. Brendan Aaronson was officially transferred to Red Bull Salzburg in the Austrian Bundesliga for a reported fee of $6 million, with a potential $3 million more in performance bonuses; the highest ever transfer fee for a U.S.-based homegrown player. In January, Mark McKenzie was transferred to K.R.C. Genk for a reported fee of $6 million, plus additional performance-based bonuses.

Prior to the start of the season, long-time defender, Raymon Gaddis, announced his retirement from professional soccer. The full-back spent his entire professional career with the Union, holding record in games played (221) and minutes played (18,702).

The Union traded away or passed on all picks for the 2021 MLS SuperDraft, being the third consecutive season doing so. Supplementing young players via the Union's academy, five academy players were signed to the senior team: defender Nathan Harriel, midfielder Jack McGlynn, midfielder Paxten Aaronson, defender Brandan Craig, and midfielder/forward Quinn Sullivan.

Rounding out the first team acquisitions included centerback, Stuart Findlay, from Kilmarnock FC and midfielder, Leon Flach, from FC St. Pauli.

2021 roster

Out on loan

Transfers

In

Out

Loan In

Loan Out

Competitions

Preseason

Major League Soccer

Standings

Eastern Conference

Overall table

Results summary

Results by round

Results

MLS Cup Playoffs

U.S. Open Cup 

On April 16, 2021, the U.S. Soccer Open Cup Committee announced that the planned 16-team 2021 U.S. Open Cup would no longer be held in the spring due to the COVID-19 pandemic. The committee will re-evaluate the possibility of conducting the tournament in some fashion later in the year.

CONCACAF Champions League

Round of 16

Quarter-finals

Semi-finals

Statistics

Appearances and goals
Last updated December 19, 2021

|-
! colspan=14 style=background:#dcdcdc; text-align:center|Goalkeepers

|-
! colspan=14 style=background:#dcdcdc; text-align:center|Defenders

|-
! colspan=14 style=background:#dcdcdc; text-align:center|Midfielders

|-
! colspan=14 style=background:#dcdcdc; text-align:center|Forwards

|-

References

Philadelphia Union
Philadelphia Union seasons
Philadelphia Union
Philadelphia Union
Philadelphia